is a Japanese professional footballer who plays as a defensive midfielder for J1 League club Urawa Red Diamonds.

Playing career
Hirano was born in Tokyo on March 11, 1996. After graduating from Kokushikan University, he joined J2 League club Mito HollyHock in 2018.

Club statistics

Honours

Club
Urawa Red Diamonds
Japanese Super Cup: 2022

References

External links

Profile at Urawa Red Diamonds

1996 births
Living people
Kokushikan University alumni
Association football people from Tokyo
Japanese footballers
J2 League players
Mito HollyHock players
Urawa Red Diamonds players
Association football midfielders